James M. Sodetz is an American biologist, focusing in biochemistry; protein chemistry, protein engineering, and molecular biology; structure-function studies of proteins and enzymes of blood with emphasis on the human complement system, currently the Carolina Distinguished Professor / Biochemistry and Molecular Biology at University of South Carolina and an Elected Fellow of the American Association for the Advancement of Science.

References

Fellows of the American Association for the Advancement of Science
21st-century American biologists
Living people
Knox College (Illinois) alumni
University of Notre Dame alumni
University of South Carolina faculty
Year of birth missing (living people)